Here Comes Kelly is a 1943 American comedy crime film directed by William Beaudine and starring Eddie Quillan, Joan Woodbury and Armida. It was produced and distributed by Monogram Pictures. It was followed by a sequel There Goes Kelly in 1945.

Cast
 Eddie Quillan as Jimmy Kelly
 Joan Woodbury as Margie Burke
 Maxie Rosenbloom as Trixie Bell
 Armida as Babette
 Sidney Miller as Sammy Cohn
 Mary Gordon as Mrs. Kelly
 Ian Keith as L. Herbert Oakley
 Luis Alberni as Nick
 Charles Jordan as Stevens
 Emmett Vogan as District Attorney
 John Dilson
 Dick Elliott as Driscoll
 Sugar Geise as Blondie

References

External links
 

1943 films
1943 crime drama films
American prison drama films
American black-and-white films
Films directed by William Beaudine
Monogram Pictures films
American crime drama films
1940s English-language films
1940s American films